The KiKiallus Indian Nation is a group claiming to be descended from the Kik-i-allus or Kikiallus band of the Swinomish Indian Tribal Community. 

The KiKiallus Indian Nation has been denied federal recognition and, contrary to what is often claimed by its proponents, do not have recognition from the state government of Washington. The Swinomish Indian Tribal Community states that the current Swinomish tribe is descended from the original inhabitants of Skagit county, which included the Kikiallus band. The Kikiallus band signed the 1855 Treaty of Point Elliot as the Kik-i-allus under Chief Sd-zo-mahtl, thereby electing to move to the Swinomish Reservation.

References

Native American tribes in Washington (state)
Skagit County, Washington
Coast Salish